SS Volodarskiy was a Soviet freighter of about 3,100 tonnes displacement which was active in the Arctic during the 1930s. This ship had been normally used for carrying timber.

Volodarskiy was named after V. Volodarsky (Moisey Markovich Goldshteyn) (1891–1918), a Russian revolutionary and an early Soviet politician.

In 1933 Volodarskiy took part in the first Soviet convoy to the mouth of the Lena, under Captain N. V. Smagin, along with steamers Pravda and Tovarich Stalin. The convoy leader, Captain M. A. Sorokin, was on board Volodarskiy. This convoy was led by icebreaker Krasin (Captain Ya. P. Legzdin). 

On the way back, severe ice conditions in the Vilkitsky Strait (between Severnaya Zemlya and Cape Chelyuskin), forced the three freighters of the convoy to winter at Ostrov Samuila in the Komsomolskaya Pravda Islands. A shore station was built and a full scientific programme maintained all winter by leader scientist N. N. Urvantsev and his wife, Dr. Yelizaveta Ivanovna, the expedition's medical officer.

The three ships were released in the following year by Feodor Litke after much effort to break a channel through the thick ice. Then Volodarskiy headed to Tiksi to load coal in order to bunker the ships of the second Lena expedition.

References
 
 

Ships of the Soviet Union
Laptev Sea
Polar exploration by Russia and the Soviet Union
Arctic exploration vessels